Víctor Manuel Afonso Mateos (born 27 August 1971) is a Spanish retired footballer who played as a central defender, and currently is a manager.

Playing career

He spent the majority of his playing time in Las Palmas, his hometown's club in the Canary Islands.

Managerial statistics

Honours

Manager

Lincoln Red Imps
Gibraltar Premier Division: 2018–19

References

External links

1971 births
Living people
Footballers from Las Palmas
Spanish footballers
Association football defenders
Segunda División players
Segunda División B players
Tercera División players
UD Las Palmas Atlético players
UD Las Palmas players
Albacete Balompié players
Universidad de Las Palmas CF footballers
Hércules CF players
Spanish football managers
Atlético Madrid B managers
Al-Ta'ee managers
Lincoln Red Imps F.C. managers
Saudi First Division League managers
Gibraltar National League managers
Expatriate football managers in Saudi Arabia
Spanish expatriates in Saudi Arabia